Johann Georg Stuhr (1640–1721) was a German Baroque painter.  He was born and died in Hamburg.

Biography
According to Houbraken he was the teacher of the Lubienetski brothers in Hamburg before they travelled to Amsterdam.

According to the RKD, he was the teacher of Christoffel and Theodor Lubienitzki. Known for battles, landscapes and marines.

References

External links

Johann Georg Stuhr on Artnet

German Baroque painters
17th-century German painters
German male painters
18th-century German painters
18th-century German male artists
Artists from Hamburg
1640 births
1721 deaths